Dr. John Miller-Masury House, also known as Lakeside (1906–1935), Crystal Club (1935–1939), and Greystone Manor (1942-present), is a historic home located at Virginia Beach, Virginia.  It was built in 1906–1908, and is a -story, five-bay, L-shaped stone-and-slate dwelling.  It is covered by two hipped roofs with dormers, which intersect at a three-story castellated tower.  It has a one-story, deep, wraparound porch.  From 1936 to 1939, the building housed the Crystal Club, a gambling casino and nightclub.

It was added to the National Register of Historic Places in 1997.

References

Houses on the National Register of Historic Places in Virginia
Houses completed in 1908
Houses in Virginia Beach, Virginia
National Register of Historic Places in Virginia Beach, Virginia
1908 establishments in Virginia